Luciano Federico "Chichón" Nieto (born 19 January 1991) is an Argentinian footballer  who  plays as an attacking midfielder for Peruvian club Sport Boys.

Honours
Huracán
Argentine Primera División Runner-up (1): 2009 Clausura

References

External links

1991 births
Living people
Argentine footballers
Argentine expatriate footballers
Association football midfielders
Sportspeople from Buenos Aires Province
Club Atlético Huracán footballers
Aragua FC players
Estudiantes de Buenos Aires footballers
Guillermo Brown footballers
Club Atlético Brown footballers
Sport Boys Warnes players
Chacarita Juniors footballers
Sport Boys footballers
Argentine Primera División players
Primera B Metropolitana players
Primera Nacional players
Venezuelan Primera División players
Bolivian Primera División players
Argentine expatriate sportspeople in Venezuela
Argentine expatriate sportspeople in Bolivia
Argentine expatriate sportspeople in Peru
Expatriate footballers in Venezuela
Expatriate footballers in Bolivia
Expatriate footballers in Peru